Robson Alves Reis (born 21 May 2000), known as Robson Reis or simply Robson, is a Brazilian professional footballer who plays for Portuguese club Boavista, on loan from Santos. Mainly a central defender, he can also play as a defensive midfielder.

Career

Santos
On 12 June 2019, he agreed to a loan move to Santos, being initially assigned to the under-20 squad.

On 1 February 2021, despite having his loan deal expired, Robson was called up to train with the main squad by manager Cuca. Seven days later, he was bought outright by Peixe and signed a permanent three-year deal.

Robson made his professional debut on 28 February 2021, coming on as a second-half substitute for fellow debutant Kaiky in a 2–2 Campeonato Paulista away draw against Santo André. He made his Série A debut on 28 August, starting in a 0–4 home loss against Flamengo.

Loan to Boavista
On 27 June 2022, Robson moved abroad for the first time in his career, after signing a one-year loan deal with Portuguese Primeira Liga side Boavista, with a buyout clause.

Career statistics

References

External links
Santos FC profile 

2000 births
Living people
People from Vitória da Conquista
Sportspeople from Bahia
Brazilian footballers
Association football defenders
Campeonato Brasileiro Série A players
Primeira Liga players
Santos FC players
Boavista F.C. players
Brazilian expatriate footballers
Brazilian expatriate sportspeople in Portugal
Expatriate footballers in Portugal